The 2016–17 season was Newcastle United's second season in the 21st century to be played in the Championship, following their relegation from the Premier League. This season Newcastle United participated in the EFL Championship, EFL Cup and FA Cup. The season covers the period from 1 July 2016 to 30 June 2017.

Club

Coaching staff
The Newcastle United first team coaching staff for the 2016–17 season consists of the following:

Players

First team squad

Reserve team

Youth team

Transfers and loans

Transfers In

 Total spending:  £57,000,000

Transfers Out

 Total incoming:  ~ £87,000,000

Loans In

Loans Out

Pre-season friendlies

Competitions

Overall summary

Overview

Cards
Accounts for all competitions. Last updated on 7 May 2017.

Goals
Last updated on 7 May 2017.

Clean sheets
Last updated on 7 May 2017.

References

Newcastle United F.C. seasons
Newcastle United